The 2016 Delta State Statesmen football team represented the Delta State University in the 2016 NCAA Division II football season. They were led by head coach Todd Cooley, who was in his fourth season at Delta State. The Statesmen played their home games at McCool Stadium and were members of the Gulf South Conference. They finished the season with a record of 4 wins and 6 losses (4–6 overall, 3–5 in the GSC) and were not invited in the 2016 playoffs.

Schedule
Delta State announced its 2016 football schedule which consists of six home and four away games in the regular season. The Statesmen will host GSC foes Mississippi College, North Alabama, Shorter, and West Florida, and will travel to Florida Tech, Valdosta State, West Alabama and West Georgia.

The Statesmen will host both non-conference games against Kentucky Wesleyan of the Great Midwest Athletic Conference and Texas A&M–Commerce of the Lone Star Conference.

References

Delta State
Delta State Statesmen football seasons
Delta State Statesmen football